Allognathus hispanicus (now known as Allognathus balearicus) is a species of land snail in the family Helicidae, the true snails. This species is endemic to Mallorca, one of Spain's Balearic Islands. The common name is "caragol de Serp" (snake snail), due to the pattern of it shell.

The snail lives in cracks in rocks and walls, and is only active when it rains.

Description 
Globose-flatenned shell with 4 ½ whorls with a clear suture and thin and irregular striation. Last whorl 3 times larger than the penultimate, growing progressively to the aperture. The aperture is oblique-oval descending from the third to the fourth whorl. Soft peristome with a brownish inner lip slightly reflected. Umbilicus completely closed.

Distribution 
The species is distributed along the northern Tramuntana Mountains in western Mallorca, cohabiting in many localities with A. graellsianus.

References

External links 
 http://luisjavierchueca.com/research-3/allognathus/

Helicidae